Events in the year 2019 in Slovakia.

Incumbents
 President – Andrej Kiska (Independent)
 Prime Minister – Peter Pellegrini 
 Speaker of the National Council – Andrej Danko

Events

16 March — Scheduled date for the 2019 Slovak presidential election
30 March — Zuzana Čaputová is elected president, the first female president in Slovakia's history.
29 April — The Supreme Court of the Slovak Republic rejects a motion to dissolve the far-right Nationalist People's Party Our Slovakia.

Deaths

13 February – Miroslav Kusý, political scientist (b. 1931).
20 April – Peter Colotka, academic, lawyer and politician, former Prime Minister (b. 1925).

See also

 2019 European Parliament election

References

 
2010s in Slovakia
Years of the 21st century in Slovakia
Slovakia
Slovakia